2000 Academy Awards may refer to:

 72nd Academy Awards, the Academy Awards ceremony that took place in 2000
 73rd Academy Awards, the 2001 ceremony honoring the best in film for 2000
 Academy Awards and nominations for the 1968 film 2001: A Space Odyssey